Dalton Kellett (born August 19, 1993) is a Canadian former racing driver from Stouffville, Ontario. He last competed in the IndyCar Series, driving for A. J. Foyt Racing.

Racing career

Early years
Kellett started his racing career in snowmobile racing at the age of three, moving up to go-kart racing after a hiatus while convincing his parents to let him race. After karting, Kellett competed in the Ontario Formula Ford Championship in 2011 where he finished third.

Road to Indy
In 2012 he competed in the U.S. F2000 National Championship for Pabst Racing Services and finished 11th in the 2012 U.S. F2000 Winterfest and 14th in the 2012 U.S. F2000 National Championship season, and returned to Pabst to race in U.S. F2000 in 2013. 

Kellett made his Pro Mazda Championship debut in July 2013 for Team Pelfrey at Canadian Tire Motorsports Park, finishing 10th and 8th in two races. In the following months, Kellett and Pabst announced that they would join the Indy Lights series for the series' race at Baltimore and contest the 2014 season in the series together. Kellett crashed out on the second lap of the Baltimore race, but still became the first driver to race in all three Road to Indy divisions during the same season. On November 14 he announced that he would race in the Pro Mazda Championship with Team Pelfrey in 2014. Kellett finished 10th in the championship with one podium finish at Houston, and returned to the series in 2015 with Andretti Autosport. He again finished 10th in the championship with one podium finish, this time a second place at Iowa Speedway.

On September 22, 2015, Kellett announced that he would stay with Andretti Autosport to compete in the Indy Lights series in 2016, becoming the first driver to confirm plans for the series for the 2016 season. On September 8, 2016, the team confirmed Kellett's return for the 2017 season. He also returned to Andretti in 2018, winning the Freedom 100 pole.

After spending three years with Andretti in Indy Lights, Kellett moved to Juncos Racing for the 2019 season and also made some WeatherTech SportsCar Championship starts in the LMP2 class with PRI/Mathiasen Motorsports. Kellett drove the sports car races to practice live pit stops before a hopeful IndyCar Series ride in 2020.

IndyCar Series
On February 4, 2020, A. J. Foyt Racing announced that Kellett would race for the team, mostly on road and street courses in the 2020 season.

Kellett's ride expanded to full-time for 2021. He improved his best finish to 12th at World Wide Technology Raceway.

A.J. Foyt Racing re-upped Kellett for another season in 2022, partnering him with 2021 Indy Lights champion Kyle Kirkwood. Kellett's best finish was 17th at Texas Motor Speedway and he finished the championship in 25th place, last among full-time drivers.

On October 12, 2022, Kellett announced he would not be returning to the team for the 2023 season.

Education
Kellett graduated from Queen's University at Kingston with a degree in engineering physics.  "His passion for academics and STEM has been coupled with racing" and "he has teamed up with STEM organizations to use racing to inspire the next generation of scientists, engineers, and thinkers."

Racing record

Racing career summary 

† As Kellett was an unregistered driver, he was ineligible to score points.* Season still in progress.

American open–wheel racing results

U.S. F2000 National Championship

Pro Mazda Championship

 Kellett was an unregistered driver for the 2013 Pro Mazda season.

Indy Lights

IndyCar Series
(key) (Races in bold indicate pole position; races in italics indicate fastest lap)

* Season still in progress.

Indianapolis 500

References

External links
 
 
 
 

1993 births
Living people
People from Whitchurch-Stouffville
Racing drivers from Ontario
IndyCar Series drivers
Indianapolis 500 drivers
Indy Lights drivers
Indy Pro 2000 Championship drivers
U.S. F2000 National Championship drivers
Team Pelfrey drivers
Andretti Autosport drivers
Juncos Hollinger Racing drivers
A. J. Foyt Enterprises drivers
WeatherTech SportsCar Championship drivers